Suvorotskoye is a rural locality (a selo) in Bogolyubovskoye Rural Settlement, Suzdalsky District, Vladimir Oblast, Russia. The population was 178 as of 2010. There are 22 streets.

Geography 
Suvorotskoye is located 24 km south of Suzdal (the district's administrative centre) by road. Sadovy is the nearest rural locality.

References 

Rural localities in Suzdalsky District